The enzyme unit, or international unit for enzyme (symbol U, sometimes also IU) is a unit of enzyme's catalytic activity. 

1 U (μmol/min) is defined as the amount of the enzyme that catalyzes the conversion of one micromole of substrate per minute under the specified conditions of the assay method. 

The specified conditions will usually be the optimum conditions, which including but not limited to temperature, pH, and substrate concentration, that yield the maximal substrate conversion rate for that particular enzyme. In some assay method, one usually takes a temperature of 25°C. 

The enzyme unit was adopted by the International Union of Biochemistry in 1964. Since the minute is not an SI base unit of time, the enzyme unit is discouraged in favor of the katal, the unit recommended by the General Conference on Weights and Measures in 1978 and officially adopted in 1999. 

One katal is the enzyme activity that converts one mole of substrate per second under specified assay conditions, so 

1 U = 1 μmol/min = 1/60 μmol/s ≈ 16.67 nmol/s;
16.67 nkat = 16.67 nmol/s;
Therefore, 1 U = 16.67 nkat

The concept of enzyme unit should not be confused with the one of international unit (IU). Although it is true that 1 U = 1 IU (because, for many enzymes, the existing U was adopted as the later IU), international units can be defined for the biologic activity of many other kinds of substance besides enzymes (for example, vitamins and hormones).

See also
Turnover number
Enzyme assay
Enzyme catalysis

References

Units of catalytic activity